Ahmed Saleh Haboush (Arabic:أحمد صالح حبوش) (born 24 December 1991) is an Emirati footballer who plays for Al Urooba as a midfielder.

External links

References

Emirati footballers
1991 births
Living people
Baniyas Club players
Dibba FC players
Khor Fakkan Sports Club players
Al Urooba Club players
UAE First Division League players
UAE Pro League players
Association football midfielders